Myrmecia pavida is a bull ant species that lives in and is native to Australia. Described by John S. Clark in 1951, the Myrmecia Pavida is distributed and has been mainly collected from the states of Western Australia and South Australia.

The average length of a worker is 19-22 millimeters. Queens are larger at over 25 millimeters in length. The head and gaster are black. The thorax, node, legs, and other features are brown. The antennae and tarsi are red, and the mandibles and clypeus are yellow.

Biology and Behavior
Like other ants of the genus Myrmecia, Myrmecia pavida has excellent vision. They are mostly nocturnal. They are also highly aggressive when potential intruders and humans disrupt their nests.

After numerous tests about the mating system and generic structure of the bull ant Myrmecia pavida, Chappell wrote:

References

Myrmeciinae
Hymenoptera of Australia
Insects described in 1951
Insects of Australia